The 2013 Algerian Cup Final was the 49th final of the Algerian Cup. The final took place on May 1, 2013, at Stade 5 Juillet 1962 in Algiers with kick-off at 16:00. USM Alger beat MC Alger 1-0 to win their eighth Algerian Cup.

Algerian Ligue Professionnelle 1 clubs MC Alger and USM Alger will contest the final, in what will be the 92nd edition of the Algiers derby. The competition winners are awarded a berth in the 2014 CAF Confederation Cup.

Pre-match
MC Alger were appearing in an Algerian Cup final for a seventh time. They had won the cup six times previously (in 1971, 1973, 1976, 1983, 2006, 2007) and had never lost in the final, with four of their six final wins came against USM Alger. USM Alger were appearing in a final a record seventeenth time and had won the cup seven times previously (in 1981, 1988, 1997, 1999, 2001, 2003, 2004).

Details

|}

References

Cup
Algerian Cup Finals
USM Alger matches